Qarayeri (also, Karayeri) is a village and municipality in the Samukh Rayon of Azerbaijan.  It has a population of 5,910.  The municipality consists of the villages of Qarayeri and Yenibağ.

References 

Populated places in Samukh District